The 1975 Greenlandic Men's Handball Championship (also known as the  or ) was the 2nd edition of the Greenlandic Men's Handball Championship. It was held in Nuuk. It was won by S-68.

Venues 
The championship was played at the Godthåbhallen in Nuuk.

Table

Results

References 

1975
Handball - Men